Petite Soeur Island, also called Small Sister, West Sister, is an island in the Seychelles archipelago, Located north of La Digue.
It is part of Iles Soeurs with Grande Soeur. It is a granitic island covered with tropical forests. 
The island is privately owned.

History
In 2005 the island was put up for sale, and was bought by hotel Château de Feuilles from Praslin Island. It is visited by their guests, especially for diving.

Gallery

References

External links

Islands of La Digue and Inner Islands